Megarhyssa atrata, also known as the black giant ichneumonid wasp, is a species of large ichneumon wasp. It is known from North America, where it is found from Quebec, Michigan, Ohio and North and South Carolina to Florida.

Adults are on wing from May to July.

The larvae are parasitoids of the larvae of the woodwasp Tremex columba in dead deciduous trees.

References

Ichneumonidae
Insects described in 1781